The Woman's Angle is 1952 British drama film directed by Leslie Arliss and starring Edward Underdown, Cathy O'Donnell and Lois Maxwell. It is based on the novel Three Cups of Coffee by Ruth Feiner.

Premise
The film is the story of three love affairs of man who belongs to celebrated family of musicians, culminating in divorce and his final discovery of happiness.

Cast

 Edward Underdown as Robert Mansell
 Cathy O'Donnell as Nina Van Rhyne
 Lois Maxwell as Enid Mansell
 Claude Farell as Delysia Veronova
 Peter Reynolds as Brian Mansell
 Marjorie Fielding as Mrs. Mansell
 Anthony Nicholls as Doctor Nigel Jarvis
 Isabel Dean as Isobel Mansell
 John Bentley as Renfro Mansell
 Olaf Pooley as Rudolph Mansell
 Ernest Thesiger as Judge
 Eric Pohlmann as Steffano
 Joan Collins as Marina
 Malcolm Knight as Shepherd Boy
 Fred Berger as Restaurant Manager
 Dana Wynter as Elaine
 Leslie Weston as Suttley
 Geoffrey Toone as Count Cambia
 Lea Seidl as Madame Kossoff
 Anton Diffring as Peasant
 Miles Malleson as A. Secrett
 Peter Illing as Sergei
 Teddy Johnson as Nightclub Singer
 Sylva Langova as Blonde in Sleigh	
 Bill Shine (actor) as Saunders	
 Nora Gordon as Guest House Owner		
 Wensley Pithey as Mr Witherspool	
 Rufus Cruickshank as the Scot	
 Fred Griffiths as Cockney at Bus Stop

Production
Arliss had been a fan of the novel since he read it in 1944.

Critical reception
In The New York Times, Bosley Crowther thought the film "...a grim little sample of bad writing, bad acting and bad directing all around."

References

External links

1952 films
1952 drama films
Films directed by Leslie Arliss
Films shot at Associated British Studios
British drama films
British black-and-white films
1950s English-language films
1950s British films